The South African Transport and Allied Workers Union (SATAWU) is a trade union in South Africa.

History
In the late 1990s, the South African Railways and Harbours Union (SARHWU) and Transport and General Workers' Union (TGWU) were both affiliates of the Congress of South African Trade Unions and undertook lengthy negotiations on a potential merger.  In December 1998, the Black Trade Union of Transnet Workers and the Transnet Allied Trade Union merged into SARWHU, which renamed itself as the "South African Transport and Allied Workers' Union".  On 18 May 2000, the TGWU finally merged with this union, forming a new entity, which was also named SATAWU.

The union suffered a split in 2012, when former president Ephraim Mphahlela led around half the membership into the new National Transport Movement.  A further split in 2015 led to the founding of the Democratised Transport Logistics and Allied Workers Union.  SATAWU is an affiliate of the COSATU and the International Transport Workers' Federation.

Chinese arms ship refusal

In May 2008, the An Yue Jiang, a ship from the People's Republic of China bearing a large amount of Chinese-manufactured weapons that were bound for Zimbabwe, had docked in Durban harbor; but the dock employees, who were all members of SATAWU, refused to unload the ship of its inventory. SATAWU and COSATU supported the refusal of the cargo, and trade union federations in other southern African countries also refused to unload the ship when it subsequently redocked in other harbors, such as Walvis Bay and Luanda.

General Secretaries
2000: Randall Howard
2009: Zenzo Mahlangu
2018: Jack Mazibuko

References

External links
SATAWU official website

Trade unions based in Johannesburg
Congress of South African Trade Unions
International Transport Workers' Federation
Transport trade unions in South Africa
Trade unions established in 2000
Trade unions in South Africa